The Cameroon national rugby union team (French:  Equipe du Cameroun du Rugby XV), also known as the Indomitable Lions,  represents Cameroon in the sport of rugby union. They are ranked as a tier-three nation by the International Rugby Board (IRB). Cameroon have thus far not qualified for a Rugby World Cup, but have competed in qualifying tournaments. Cameroon also compete annually in the Africa Cup.

History
In 2001 Cameroon played in the African qualification tournaments for the 2003 Rugby World Cup in Australia. Grouped in Pool A of Round 1, along with Uganda and Zambia. Cameroon lost their first match by one point, 25-24 to Zambia, but then defeated Uganda 17 to nil. Cameroon finished first in the final standings, advancing to Round 2.

In Round 2 Cameroon faced both Kenya and Madagascar. In their first match, Cameroon lost to Madagascar. They finished third in the standings after then losing to Kenya.

Cameroon participated in the African qualifying tournament for the 2007 Rugby World Cup, playing in the Northern Pool of Round 1a, along with Senegal and Nigeria. Cameroon finished second in the final standings after narrowly losing to Senegal, and defeating Nigeria. They also competed in the 2006 Africa Cup.

Record

World Cup

Overall
As of 11 December 2012 their record against all nations is as follows:

See also
 Rugby union in Cameroon

Footnotes

References

External links
 Cameroon on rugbydata.com
 
 History of Rugby in Cameroon (In French)
 Seul un renouvellement de la fédé fera revenir les pros
 Report of Kenya-Cameroon Game

African national rugby union teams
National sports teams of Cameroon
Rugby union in Cameroon